Paulownia elongata is a species of tree in the family Paulowniaceae, native to Asia.

The plant's leaves are very large and pubescent ('fuzzy—hairy'). This species can withstand a very wide range of environmental conditions. It does not grow at higher altitudes however.

Uses

Cultivation
Paulownia elongata is cultivated as an ornamental tree for use in gardens and parks. It is selected for its purple flowers, and its shade tolerance.

Biofuel
The tree is planted and grown as feedstock for biofuel production. Due to the large quantity of biomass produced annually, it is suited for use as biofuel feedstock.

Lumber
Paulownia elongata is planted as a forestry tree producing strong, yet light, wood. It is grown for lumber in North America and China.

Commercial plantations are normally established from selected clones resulting from micropropagation.

It is reportedly the fastest-growing hardwood tree.   
Some proponents state that P. elongata plantations can reach a harvestable size in five to seven years..

References

External links

Paulowniaceae
Flora of Asia
Flora of China
Energy crops
Garden plants of Asia
Ornamental trees
Plants described in 1896